Poly(ethyl methacrylate) (PEMA) is a hydrophobic synthetic acrylate polymer. It has properties similar to the more common PMMA, however it produces less heat during polymerization, has a lower modulus of elasticity and an overall softer texture. It may be vulcanized using lead oxide as a catalyst and it can be softened using ethanol.

It is used as an impression material of ear canals for fabrication of hearing aids. It is also used in dentistry as a chair-side denture reline material for partial and complete dentures as well as a tissue conditioner with implant supported dentures. It is used as a component of fossil coating and preservation  and for fabricating artificial nails

References

Acrylate polymers
Plastics
Thermoplastics
Dental materials
Audiology
Impression material